Richard Campbell (born 22 November 1953) is a Scottish football manager and former player, who is currently manager of Arbroath.

Campbell's playing career was low-profile and he is more known for his management career which includes successful lengthy spells at Brechin City, Forfar Athletic and Arbroath. Campbell also managed Cowdenbeath, Dunfermline Athletic, Partick Thistle and Ross County. He has achieved five promotions at four clubs with the highlights taking Brechin from the fourth tier to the second tier and repeated the feat with Arbroath many years later.

Playing career
Campbell's playing career was mainly spent in the lower leagues of Scottish football. Having started out with Dundee United's youth system he then played for Cowdenbeath, Dunfermline Athletic, Ross County (then in the Highland League), Brechin City and East Stirlingshire.

Coaching career
Campbell has accrued more than 1,300 games in the dugout either as an assistant manager or manager in Scottish football. He has won 3 separate Manager of the year awards and over 35 manager of the month awards in a career spanning decades.

Cowdenbeath
Campbell's first managerial experience was a short spell at the helm of Cowdenbeath in 1987, after which he returned to coaching at Brechin City.

Dunfermline Athletic
He moved to Dunfermline Athletic to become Bert Paton's assistant. Paton and Campbell guided Dunfermline to promotion in the 1995–96 Scottish First Division season, and also achieved their highest league position, finishing fifth in the 1996–97 Scottish Premier Division season. Paton and Campbell's team were known for their adventurous attacking style of play. They were also praised for their handling of the club during the time of legendary captain Norrie McCathie's tragic death. When Paton resigned in early 1999, Campbell was given temporary control of the team. After a 3-month probationary period, Campbell was made permanent manager at East End Park. However, he left before the end of the year, despite Dunfermline sitting top of the First Division; the club was taken over by new owners who decided Campbell wasn't their man.

Brechin City
After several months out of the game, Campbell was appointed manager of Brechin City in 2000, with Paton this time acting as his assistant. Over the following five seasons he helped Brechin rise from the Third Division to the First Division, despite their status as a part-time club. The chance to work with full-time players again tempted him to move to Partick Thistle in 2005.

Partick Thistle
Campbell took over as Thistle manager after the end of Gerry Britton's and Derek Whyte's reign as joint player managers. Initial success was gained, and he won a Manager of the Month award within a month of taking over at the club. Despite this early success, Thistle finished ninth at the end of the 2004–05 season, and were therefore relegated to the Second Division. In the 2005–06 season, he guided the Partick Thistle team to promotion through the play-offs into the First Division, after finishing fourth in the Second Division.

Campbell has been praised in recent times for his negotiation skills, with particular reference to the signing of Simon Donnelly at the start of the 2006–07 season. However, despite a decent start, a string of poor results saw Thistle languishing in the bottom half of the table and his tenure was ended on 27 March 2007.

Ross County
In the summer of 2007, Campbell was appointed manager of just-relegated Ross County, with the proviso that he would have only one chance at earning the club promotion, and would be sacked if he was unsuccessful. Ultimately, Campbell was not even given a full season in charge, and despite leading the club to the top of Division Two he was sacked on 2 October, allegedly for the team not playing a certain style of football.

Forfar Athletic
On 8 May 2008, Campbell was appointed manager of Scottish Third Division side Forfar Athletic. On 17 May 2010, he led the club to promotion to the Second Division after defeating local rivals Arbroath in the play-offs, a result which relegated the Red Lichties. Forfar went on to finish in the promotion play off positions in three of the four seasons in League One, missing out on the league championship on the last day to Greenock Morton in the 2014–15 campaign. Following an overhaul of the Forfar squad and a poor run of form midway through the 2015–16 campaign Campbell was sacked on Saturday 12 December 2015, after seven years in charge.

Arbroath
After leaving Forfar, Campbell made it clear that it was his intention to return to football management at the earliest opportunity. After less than three months out of management, Campbell returned to Angus after being appointed manager of Scottish League Two side Arbroath in March 2016. He led the "Red Lichties" to the Scottish League Two title in his first full season. In his second season, Arbroath finished 3rd and were narrowly beaten in the Championship play off semi final against Dumbarton. He then led Arbroath to the Scottish League One title in the 2018–19 season.

2015-16 season

When appointed manager Arbroath were 8th in League Two and the immediate priority for Campbell was to steer the team clear of the relegation play-off spot. Though the end to the season was largely lacklustre with several disappointing results, Campbell did achieve his immediate remit as Arbroath avoided a bottom place finish and finished 9th.

2016-17 season

Before the season kicked off confidence was starting to grow that Arbroath could mount a serious title challenge. Campbell was keen to construct his own side and was active in the summer transfer window, with signings including Ryan McCord and Colin Hamilton. These acquisitions helped to bolster a squad which many felt had sufficient quality, mainly provided through star-man Bobby Linn, but lacked the confidence required to succeed.

2019-20 season

In a season curtailed by the COVID-19 pandemic, Campbell guided Arbroath to a historic league finish of 5th – the club's highest in many decades. Gayfield Park quickly became a notoriously difficult venue for away teams to visit as The Lichties became effective at using the bitterly cold and gusty wind conditions to their advantage. Campbell helped to provide the biggest upset of the entire Championship season as Arbroath became the only team to defeat eventual champions Dundee United at Tannadice.

2020-21 season

Personal life
Campbell was brought up in Hill of Beath. He has a twin brother Ian who is also a former football player and manager. They worked together for many years at both Dunfermline, where Ian was a coach, and Brechin City, where Ian was Dick's joint-assistant. When Dick left to manage Partick Thistle, Ian took over the Brechin managerial reins. The brothers were reunited at Forfar, where Ian assistant manager. The pair worked together once again at Arbroath.

Campbell's son Iain is also involved in football, with the left-back leaving Alloa Athletic during the 2009 close season to join his father at Forfar and so joining his brother Ross, who was already at the club.

Honours
Brechin City
Scottish Third Division: 2001–02
Scottish Second Division promotion: 2002–03

Partick Thistle
Scottish Second Division play–offs: 2005–06

Forfar Athletic
Scottish Second Division play–offs: 2009–10

Arbroath
Scottish League Two: 2016–17
Scottish League One: 2018–19

Individual
Forfar Athletic
SPFL League One Manager of the Month: October 2014; March 2015;
Arbroath

Scottish League Two Manager of the Year: 2016–17
Scottish League One Manager of the Year: 2018–19
Scottish Championship Manager of the Year: 2021–22
SPFL Championship Manager of the Month: February 2021

Managerial statistics

References

External links

Managerial Career at Soccerbase.com

1953 births
Arbroath F.C. managers
Brechin City F.C. managers
Brechin City F.C. players
Cowdenbeath F.C. managers
Cowdenbeath F.C. players
Dundee United F.C. players
Dunfermline Athletic F.C. managers
Dunfermline Athletic F.C. players
East Stirlingshire F.C. players
Forfar Athletic F.C. managers
Living people
Partick Thistle F.C. managers
Ross County F.C. managers
Ross County F.C. players
Scottish Football League managers
Scottish Football League players
Scottish football managers
Scottish footballers
Scottish Professional Football League managers
Scottish Premier League managers
People from Hill of Beath
Scottish twins
Twin sportspeople
Highland Football League players
Identical twins
Association football fullbacks
Footballers from Fife